The Ambassador of the United Kingdom to Jordan is the United Kingdom of Great Britain and Northern Ireland's (UK) foremost diplomatic representative in the Hashemite Kingdom of Jordan, and in charge of the UK's diplomatic mission in Amman.

List of heads of mission

Residents in Amman to Transjordan
 Apr 1921 – 21 Nov 1921: Albert Abramson
 21 Nov 1921 – Apr 1924: St John Philby
 Aug 1924 – Mar 1939: Charles Henry Fortnom Cox
 Mar 1939 – 17 Jun 1946: Alec Kirkbride

Ambassadors to Jordan
1946–1952: Sir Alec Kirkbride
1952–1954: Geoffrey Furlonge
1954–1956: Sir Charles Duke
1956–1959: Sir Charles Johnston
1960–1962: John Henniker-Major
1962–1966: Sir Roderick Parkes
1966–1970: Sir Philip Adams
1970–1972: John Phillips
1972–1975: Glencairn Balfour Paul
1975–1979: John Campbell Moberly
1979–1984: Alan Urwick
1984–1988: Sir John Coles
1988–1991: Anthony Reeve
1991–1993: [[Patrick Eyers]]
1993–1997: Peter Hinchcliffe
1997–2000: Christopher Battiscombe
2000–2002: Edward Chaplin
2002–2006: Christopher Prentice
2006–2011: James Watt
2011–2015: Peter Millett
2015–2020: Edward Oakden

2020–present: Bridget Brind

References

Bibliography

External links
UK and Jordan, gov.uk

Jordan
 
United Kingdom